Mutitu is a settlement in Kenya's Kitui County.

References 

Populated places in Eastern Province (Kenya)